Powder River is a 1953 American Western film directed by Louis King and starring Rory Calhoun, Corinne Calvet and Cameron Mitchell.

The screenplay was written by Stuart N. Lake, who two years later was the story consultant on the ABC/Desilu western television series, The Life and Legend of Wyatt Earp.

Plot
In 1875, ex-lawman Chino Bull puts away his guns and heads for the Powder River with old pal Johnny Slater to pan for gold. When he is ambushed by outlaws Loney Logan and Will Horn, Johnny comes to his rescue, and he rides to town for supplies.

At a saloon run by beautiful Frenchie Dumont, he meets Loney's brother, Harvey, a card dealer. A drunken Sam Harris begins shooting up the place, killing the sheriff with a stray bullet as everyone else flees. Chino volunteers to go in after him and knocks him out, but declines the offer to become sheriff. Frenchie's beau, gunslinger Mitch Hardin, rides into town and challenges Chino, but is stricken with a headache so painful it incapacitates him.

Returning to the river, Chino finds Johnny dead and their gold stolen. Now broke, he returns to town and reluctantly takes on the sheriff job. A stagecoach brings to town the sophisticated Debbie Allen, who has come from Connecticut to find her former sweetheart, Mitch, who was once a doctor there. She learns that Mitch is now involved with Frenchie and also that he is suffering from a brain tumour, causing the severe headaches. Debbie decides to go back east on the next stage.

Chino sets a trap. Accompanied by Mitch, who owes Chino for saving his life, they join Debbie leaving town, and let word leak of a $300,000 gold shipment being aboard. Loney's men come to rob it and are defeated, but Debbie is shot. In town, Mitch is the only one with the surgical skill to save Debbie's life, and he does so. But when all seems well, Chino discovers that it was in fact Mitch who murdered Johnny and stole their gold. As they begin to shoot it out, Mitch shoots Chino's gun out of his hand, but then collapses in agony and dies in Chino's arms.  Frenchie arrives, is distraught and cradles Mitch's head.  The next day, Frenchie boards the stage, leaving Chino and Debbie to a future together.

Cast
 Rory Calhoun as Chino Bullock
 Corinne Calvet as Frenchie Drumont
 Cameron Mitchell as Mitch Herdin
 Penny Edwards as Debbie Allen
 Carl Betz as Loney Hogan
 John Dehner as Harvey Logan
 Raymond Greenleaf as Prudy
 Victor Sutherland as Mayor Lowery

References

External links
 
 
 

1953 films
1953 Western (genre) films
Films directed by Louis King
20th Century Fox films
American Western (genre) films
1950s English-language films
1950s American films